Hélio Gomes (born 27 December 1984) is Portuguese athlete specializing in the 1500 metres. In July 2017, the now Sporting CP athlete tested positive for doping.

Competition record

Personal bests
Outdoor
800 metres – 1:49.60 (Cáceres 2006)
1500 metres – 3:38.49 (Mataró 2012)
Indoor
800 metres – 1:49.63 (Espinho 2005)
1500 metres – 3:39.46 (Gothenburg 2013)

See also
 List of doping cases in sport

References

External links
IAAF profile

1984 births
Living people
Portuguese male middle-distance runners
World Athletics Championships athletes for Portugal
S.L. Benfica athletes
Portuguese sportspeople in doping cases
Doping cases in athletics
Competitors at the 2009 Summer Universiade